Samuel D. Hodge, Jr. is an American professor, author, and public speaker with a specialty involving the intersection of law and medicine.  He teaches law, anatomy, and forensics at Temple University and serves as a mediator and neutral arbitrator for the Dispute Resolution Institute.

Education
Hodge received his J.D. from the Beasley School in 1974 and is a 1979 alumnus of the Graduate Legal Studies Division of the law school.

Hodge has also had post-graduate mediation training at the Straus Institute for Dispute Resolution at Pepperdine University School of Law and in anatomy from the Temple University Katz School of Medicine.

Career
Hodge has been a professor at Temple University for more than 45 years during which time he has taught more than 25,000 students at all levels of University instruction. Over the years, he has received numerous awards including the Temple University Great Teacher Award, the Musser Leadership Award in Teaching, the Best Instructor Award, the Crystal Apple Award for Teaching, the John DeAngelo Award for Innovative Use of Technology, John Topoleski Memorial Award for Outstanding Instruction, the Stauffer Alumni Award for Outstanding Faculty Service, the Alumni Board of Managers'Distinguished Faculty Award, the Provost Award for Innovation in Teaching in the General Education, and the Innovation in Teaching Technology Award. He was named a Master Teacher by the American Academy of Legal Studies in Business and The Academy of Teachers. His engaging teaching style has been the subject of stories in The New York Times, the Philadelphia Daily News, the Philadelphia Inquirer, the Chronicle of Higher Education, National Public Radio, and television. 

Hodge lectures internationally for The Professional Education Group on anatomy and other medical-related topics to audiences of lawyers, judges, physicians, governmental agencies, and insurance professionals. He has been named one of the most popular continuing legal education instructors in the country and Sam has conducted more than 500 programs throughout the United States and Canada. His presentation  "Anatomy for Lawyers"  was awarded the Outstanding Achievement Award – Best Program category from the international  Association for Continuing Legal Education (ACLEA).

Hodge's research focus is on the intersection of medicine and law. He is one of the most published scholars on medical/legal matters in the United States and has authored more than 700 publications in a variety of law reviews and medical and professional journals. Professor Hodge has also authored eight medical and two law-related texts and numerous supplements to those publications. His text, Anatomy for Litigators received the outstanding achievement award and he is the recipient of the Excellence in Policy Research Award.  He is on the Editorial Board of the Practical Lawyer, a publication of the American Law Institute, and was the legal reviewer for the book, James Szalados, “Law and Ethics in Neurocritical Care - A Practical Guide for Managing Clinical Complexities, Neurocritical Care Society. Professor Hodge has also written chapters in "Orthopedic Evaluation and Expert Testimony", John Wiley and Sons as well as  "The Direct Examination of a Medical Expert", Orthopedic Evaluation and Expert Testimony, John Wiley and Sons. His research has been cited in court opinions, legislation, and other publications. 

Hodge is a seasoned litigator who handles complex personal injury and trucking accident litigation.  He has achieved an AV preeminent rating, has been named a top attorney in Pennsylvania on multiple occasions and has received other awards for his skills as a lawyer.

Books
 “Anatomy and Physiology for Legal Professionals,” Book, PBI Press.
“Law and American Society, Third Edition, McGraw Hill. 
 “Legal and Regulatory Environment of Business, 4th Edition, McGraw Hill
"Head Trauma and Traumatic Brain Injuries," American Bar Association       
"The Forensic Autopsy,”  American Bar Association.
"The Spine,” American Bar Association.
" Clinical Anatomy for Lawyers,”  American Bar Association.
"Anatomy for Litigators, Second Edition,  American Bar Institute, American Bar Association.  
       "Clinical Anatomy for Attorneys , The Amerasian Law Institute  of the American Bar Association.

Other books have been published by John Wiley & Sons, McGraw-Hill Education and the American Law Institute - American Bar Association.

References

Temple University faculty
Temple University Beasley School of Law alumni